Nevia Pistrino (born 18 October 1964) is an Italian retired sprinter.

Career
During her career she participated at the 1980 Gymnasiade, 1981 European Cup (athletics), 1981 European Athletics Junior Championships, 1981 IAAF World Cup, 1987 European Cup (athletics), 1987 Mediterranean Games and 1987 World Championships in Athletics.

National records
Women's 4 × 400 metres relay Pescara 1981 3:34.69
Women's 4 × 400 metres relay Palermo 1981 3:33.53
300 metres Juniores Rieti 1981 38.6 manual (lasted until 2018)
400 metres under 18yo  54.23
1.000 metres 'Ragazze 12yo'  Udine 21.5.77 3'06”7

Progression 400 meters
1979 14yo 55.88
1980 15yo 54.65
1981 16yo 54.23
1987 22yo 54.20
1988 23yo 54.01

Achievements

References

External links
 

1964 births
Living people
Italian female sprinters
World Athletics Championships athletes for Italy
Mediterranean Games gold medalists for Italy
Athletes (track and field) at the 1987 Mediterranean Games
Mediterranean Games medalists in athletics